Juan Antonio Banuelos (born September 23, 1979) is an American former mixed martial artist who competed in the Bantamweight division.

Mixed martial arts career
Banuelos made his professional mixed martial arts debut in June 2001, knocking out Daniel Garlets at IFC Warriors Challenge 13. Following the impressive win, Banuelos would compile a record of 3–1 before signing with World Extreme Cagefighting in 2002.

World Extreme Cagefighting
Banuelos is perhaps best known for being a longtime competitor for World Extreme Cagefighting, making his debut at WEC 5: Halloween Havoc. He fought a record 14 times under the promotion, compiling a record of 9–5. His 9 WEC wins are also a promotional record, which he shares with Urijah Faber and Poppies Martinez.

Banuelos was defeated by Eddie Wineland for the first ever WEC Bantamweight Championship at WEC 20.

After the Wineland bout, Banuelos defeated Cole Escovedo, Mike French and Justin Robbins while dropping contests against Charlie Valencia and a controversial decision to Manny Tapia at WEC 32.

Banuelos defeated Scott Jorgensen via split decision at WEC 41 in a fight that many, including WEC general manager Reed Harris has speculated is a candidate for fight of the year.

Banuelos improved to 8–4 in the WEC after defeating Kenji Osawa via unanimous decision on November 18, 2009, at WEC 44.

Banuelos was scheduled to face Damacio Page on April 24, 2010, at WEC 48, but Page was forced off the card with an injury.  Banuelos instead faced Jorgensen in a rematch of their bout from WEC 41 which Banuelos won via split decision.  Banuelos lost the rematch by unanimous decision.

Banuelos faced Chad George on September 30, 2010, at WEC 51.  He won the fight via unanimous decision.

Ultimate Fighting Championship
On October 28, 2010, World Extreme Cagefighting merged with the Ultimate Fighting Championship. As part of the merger, all WEC fighters were transferred to the UFC.

Banuelos made his promotional debut against the former WEC Bantamweight Champion Miguel Torres on February 5, 2011, at UFC 126.  Banuelos struggled with the height and reach advantage of Torres and was unable to mount any significant offense until the latter half of the final round. He lost the fight via unanimous decision, and was subsequently released from the promotion.

Legacy Fighting Championship
After going 2–1 outside of the UFC, Banuelos signed with Texas based promotion Legacy FC. He faced Josh Sampo in his flyweight debut at Legacy FC 14 on September 14, 2012. He lost the fight via unanimous decision.

In his second fight within the promotion, Banuelos faced Rafael de Freitas at Legacy FC 18 on March 1, 2013. After three hard fought rounds, the bout was ruled a split draw. Banuelos faced Alptekin Ozkilic at Legacy FC 20 on May 31, 2013. He lost the fight via first round TKO, dropping his third straight fight in the process.

Championships and accomplishments
World Extreme Cagefighting
WEC North American Bantamweight Championship (One time)

Mixed martial arts record

|-
| Loss
| align=center| 20–11–1
| Joby Sanchez
| TKO (corner stoppage)
|Tachi Palace Fights 20
| 
| align=center| 2
| align=center| 2:41
| Lemoore, California, United States
| 
|-
| Loss
| align=center| 
| Alp Ozkilic
| TKO (punches)
| Legacy Fighting Championship 20
| 
| align=center| 1
| align=center| 0:30
| Corpus Christi, Texas, United States
| 
|-
| Draw
| align=center| 20–9–1
| Rafael De Freitas
| Draw (split)
| Legacy Fighting Championship 18
| 
| align=center| 3
| align=center| 5:00
| Houston, Texas, United States
| 
|-
| Loss
| align=center| 20–9
| Joshua Sampo
| Decision (unanimous)
| Legacy Fighting Championships 14
| 
| align=center| 3
| align=center| 5:00
| Houston, Texas, United States
| 
|-
| Loss
| align=center| 20–8
| Bibiano Fernandes
| TKO (punches)
| Fight For Japan: Genki Desu Ka Omisoka 2011
| 
| align=center| 1
| align=center| 1:21
| Saitama, Japan
| 
|-
| Win
| align=center| 20–7
| Masakazu Imanari
| Decision (split)
| Fight For Japan: Genki Desu Ka Omisoka 2011
| 
| align=center| 2
| align=center| 5:00
| Saitama, Japan
| 
|-
| Win
| align=center| 19–7
| Hideo Tokoro
| Decision (split)
| Dream 17
| 
| align=center| 3
| align=center| 5:00
| Saitama, Japan
| 
|-
| Loss
| align=center| 18–7
| Miguel Torres
| Decision (unanimous)
| UFC 126
| 
| align=center| 3
| align=center| 5:00
| Las Vegas, Nevada, United States
| 
|-
| Win
| align=center| 18–6
| Chad George
| Decision (unanimous)
| WEC 51
| 
| align=center| 3
| align=center| 5:00
| Broomfield, Colorado, United States
| 
|-
| Loss
| align=center| 17–6
| Scott Jorgensen
| Decision (unanimous)
| WEC 48
| 
| align=center| 3
| align=center| 5:00
| Sacramento, California, United States
| 
|-
| Win
| align=center| 17–5
| Kenji Osawa
| Decision (unanimous)
| WEC 44
| 
| align=center| 3
| align=center| 5:00
| Las Vegas, Nevada, United States
| 
|-
| Win
| align=center| 16–5
| Scott Jorgensen
| Decision (split)
| WEC 41
| 
| align=center| 3
| align=center| 5:00
| Sacramento, California, United States
| 
|-
| Win
| align=center| 15–5
| Bryan Goldsby
| KO (punch)
| PFC 10: Explosive
| 
| align=center| 2
| align=center| 0:59
| Lemoore, California, United States
| 
|-
| Loss
| align=center| 14–5
| Manny Tapia
| Decision (split)
| WEC 32: Condit vs. Prater
| 
| align=center| 3
| align=center| 5:00
| Rio Rancho, New Mexico, United States
| 
|-
| Win
| align=center| 14–4
| Justin Robbins
| Decision (unanimous)
| WEC 29
| 
| align=center| 3
| align=center| 5:00
| Las Vegas, Nevada, United States
| 
|-
| Loss
| align=center| 13–4
| Charlie Valencia
| KO (punch)
| WEC 26: Condit vs. Alessio
| 
| align=center| 1
| align=center| 3:12
| Las Vegas, Nevada, United States
| 
|-
| Win
| align=center| 13–3
| Mike French
| Decision (unanimous)
| WEC 25
| 
| align=center| 3
| align=center| 5:00
| Las Vegas, Nevada, United States
| 
|-
| Win
| align=center| 12–3
| Cole Escovedo
| Decision (unanimous)
| WEC 23: Hot August Fights
| 
| align=center| 3
| align=center| 5:00
| Lemoore, California, United States
| 
|-
| Loss
| align=center| 11–3
| Eddie Wineland
| KO (head kick and punches)
| WEC 20: Cinco de Mayhem
| 
| align=center| 1
| align=center| 2:36
| Lemoore, California, United States
| 
|-
| Win
| align=center| 11–2
| James Cottrell
| Decision (unanimous)
| WEC 19: Undisputed
| 
| align=center| 3
| align=center| 5:00
| Lemoore, California, United States
| 
|-
| Win
| align=center| 10–2
| Kimihito Nonaka
| TKO (punches)
| FFCF 5: Unleashed
| 
| align=center| 1
| align=center| 1:00
| Mangilao, Guam
| 
|-
| Win
| align=center| 9–2
| Justin Tavernini
| Decision (unanimous)
| Ultimate Cage Wars 3
| 
| align=center| 3
| align=center| 5:00
| Winnipeg, Manitoba, Canada
| 
|-
| Win
| align=center| 8–2
| Ed Tomaselli
| TKO (cut)
| WEC 17
| 
| align=center| 1
| align=center| 2:25
| Lemoore, California, United States
| 
|-
| Win
| align=center| 7–2
| Mike Lindquist
| Submission (rear naked choke)
| WEC 14
| 
| align=center| 1
| align=center| 1:38
| Lemoore, California, United States
| 
|-
| Win
| align=center| 6–2
| Brandon Shuey
| TKO (punches)
| SF 6: Battleground in Reno
| 
| align=center| 1
| align=center| 0:22
| Reno, Nevada, United States
| 
|-
| Win
| align=center| 5–2
| Yobie Song
| TKO (cut)
| Rumble on the Rock 4
| 
| align=center| 3
| align=center| 2:39
| Honolulu, Hawaii, United States
| 
|-
| Win
| align=center| 4–2
| Jim Kikuchi
| Decision (unanimous)
| Rumble on the Rock 2
| 
| align=center| 2
| align=center| 5:00
| Honolulu, Hawaii, United States
| 
|-
| Loss
| align=center| 3–2
| Jeff Bedard
| Submission (guillotine choke)
| WEC 5: Halloween Havoc
| 
| align=center| 1
| align=center| 0:43
| Lemoore, California, United States
| 
|-
| Win
| align=center| 3–1
| Steve Hecht
| Decision (unanimous)
| UAGF 1: Ultimate Cage Fighting 1
| 
| align=center| 2
| align=center| 5:00
| Los Angeles, California, United States
| 
|-
| Loss
| align=center| 2–1
| Stephen Palling
| Submission (triangle choke)
| Warriors Quest 2: Battle of Champions
| 
| align=center| 1
| align=center| 0:38
| Honolulu, Hawaii, United States
| 
|-
| Win
| align=center| 2–0
| Brian Peterson
| KO
| IFC Warriors Challenge 14
| 
| align=center| 3
| align=center| 1:51
| Fresno, California, United States
| 
|-
| Win
| align=center| 1–0
| Daniel Garlets
| TKO (punches)
| IFC Warriors Challenge 13
| 
| align=center| 1
| align=center| N/A
| Oroville, California, United States
|

References

External links
 
 

1979 births
Living people
American male mixed martial artists
American mixed martial artists of Mexican descent
Mixed martial artists from California
Bantamweight mixed martial artists
Flyweight mixed martial artists
Mixed martial artists utilizing kajukenbo
Mixed martial artists utilizing collegiate wrestling
People from Tulare, California
People from Arroyo Grande, California
Ultimate Fighting Championship male fighters
American kajukenbo practitioners
American male sport wrestlers
Amateur wrestlers